Juan José Tamayo (born October 7, 1946 in Amusco, Palencia) is a Spanish theologian and professor of theology at the  Charles III University of Madrid. He specializes in Catholic hierarchy but has broadened into Islamic studies. He has contributed to controversies about Opus Dei, and has written over 50 books. He is president of the Asociación de Teólogos Juan XXIII.

On September 16, 2009, Tamayo won the Seventh President of the Republic of Tunisia International Prize for Islamic Studies for his book Islam: Culture, Religion and Politics (in Spanish), beating some 28 candidates from 13 different countries. Tunisian President Zine El Abidine Ben Ali presented the award during a ceremony held in Carthage Palace in Carthage. The book examines western prejudices against the Islamic world, questioning the common western stereotypes of Islam as a sexist, patriarchal, and fundamentally violent religion, and how it has become a successor to communism in critique following recent events of extremism and terrorism.

Works

 1976 – Por una Iglesia del pueblo. Mañana, Madrid
 1989 – Para comprender la teología de la liberación. Estella, Verbo Divino
 1993 – Conceptos fundamentales del cristianismo. Trotta, Madrid
 1995 – Hacia la comunidad 1. La marginación, lugar social de los cristianos Trotta, Madrid
 1994 – Hacia la comunidad 2. Iglesia profética, Iglesia de los pobres. Trotta, Madrid
 1995 – Hacia la comunidad 3. Los sacramentos, liturgia del prójimo. Trotta, Madrid
 1996 – Hacia la comunidad 4. Imágenes de Jesús. Condicionamientos sociales, culturales, religiosos y de género. Trotta, Madrid
 1998 – Hacía la comunidad 5. Por eso lo mataron. El horizonte ético de Jesús de Nazaret. Trotta, Madrid
 2000 – Hacia la comunidad 6. Dios y Jesús. El horizonte religiosos de Jesús de Nazaret. Trotta, Madrid
 2000 – Diez palabras clave sobre Jesús de Nazaret. Estella, Verbo Divino
 2003 – Nuevo paradigma teológico. Trotta, Madrid
 2003 – Adiós a la cristiandad. Barcelona, Ediciones B. De esta obra hay una recensión de Laureano Xoaquín Araujo Cardalda publicada en Revista de Investigaciones Políticas y Sociológicas (RIPS), vol. 3, nº 2, 2004, pp. 152–154
 2004 – Fundamentalismos y diálogo entre religiones. Editorial Trotta, 2004.
 2005– Iglesia y sociedad en España Trotta, Madrid, 2005. In association with Jose María Castillo.
 2005 – Nuevo diccionario de teología Trotta, Madrid
 2008 – 
 2009 –

References

External links
Spanish theologian Juan José Tamayo wins award from Tunisian president

1946 births
Living people
People from the Province of Palencia
Spanish Christian theologians
Academic staff of the Charles III University of Madrid